The year 1986 was designated as the International Year of Peace by the United Nations.

Events

January
 January 1
Aruba gains increased autonomy from the Netherlands by separating from the Netherlands Antilles.
Spain and Portugal enter the European Community, which becomes the European Union in 1993.
January 11 – The Gateway Bridge in Brisbane, Australia, at this time the world's longest prestressed concrete free-cantilever bridge, is opened.
January 13–24 – South Yemen Civil War.
January 20 – The United Kingdom and France announce plans to construct the Channel Tunnel.
January 24 – The Voyager 2 space probe makes its first encounter with Uranus.
January 25 – Yoweri Museveni's National Resistance Army Rebel group takes over Uganda after leading a five-year guerrilla war in which up to half a million people are believed to have been killed. They will later use January 26 as the official date to avoid a coincidence of dates with Dictator Idi Amin's 1971 coup.
January 28 – Space Shuttle Challenger disaster – STS-51-L: Space Shuttle Challenger disintegrates 73 seconds after launch from the United States, killing the crew of seven astronauts, including schoolteacher Christa McAuliffe.
January 29 – Yoweri Museveni is sworn in as President of Uganda.

February
 February 3
 Pixar is founded by John Lasseter along with Steve Jobs.
 February 7
 President Jean-Claude Duvalier ("Baby Doc") flees Haiti, ending 28 years of family rule.
 The snap presidential election in the Philippines earlier announced by President Ferdinand Marcos is held amidst controversy, that paves the way for a chain of protests, culminating in the People Power Revolution.
 February 8 – Hinton train collision: A Canadian National train heading westbound collides with a Via Rail train in Hinton, Alberta; 23 people are killed and 71 injured in the accident.
 February 9 – Halley's Comet reaches its perihelion, the closest point to the Sun, during its second visit to the solar system in the 20th century (the first was in 1910).
 February 10 – The Maxi Trial (Italian: Maxiprocesso) begins in the bunker room of the Ucciardone prison (Palermo). It will be the largest trial against the Sicilian Mafia.
 February 11 – Human rights activist Natan Sharansky is released by Soviet authorities and leaves the country for Israel.
 February 15 – The Beechcraft Starship makes its maiden flight.
 February 16
 The Soviet liner  sinks in the Marlborough Sounds, New Zealand.
 Ouadi Doum air raid: The French Air Force raids the Libyan Ouadi Doum airbase in northern Chad.
 Mário Soares wins the second round of the Portuguese presidential election.
 February 17 – The Single European Act is signed.
 February 19
 The Soviet Union launches the Mir space station.
 The United States Senate approves a treaty outlawing genocide.
 February 22 – The People Power Revolution begins in the Philippines to remove President Ferdinand Marcos from office.
 February 25
 The 27th Congress of the Communist Party of the Soviet Union opens in Moscow. The General Secretary Mikhail Gorbachev introduces the keywords of his mandate to the audience: Glasnost and Perestroika.
 People Power Revolution: President Ferdinand Marcos of the Philippines is ousted from power and goes into exile in Hawaii after 20 years of dictatorial rule; Corazon Aquino becomes the first Filipino woman president and forms an interim government with Salvador Laurel becoming her Vice-president and Prime Minister.
 A three-day riot begins in Cairo, Egypt when around 25,000 conscripts of the Central Security Forces (CSF), staged protests in and around the city. Three luxury hotels, several nightclubs, restaurants and cars were looted and burned in the tourist districts near the Pyramids over several days. The riot became known as the Egyptian Conscripts Riot. At least 25 people died during the first day in Cairo, and an estimated 8,000 people, mostly conscripts in regions outside the city, were killed in total. 
 February 27 – The United States Senate allows its debates to be televised on a trial basis.
 February 28 – Swedish Prime Minister Olof Palme is shot to death on his way home from the cinema in Stockholm, Sweden.

March
 March 1 – Olof Palme's deputy Ingvar Carlsson becomes acting Prime Minister of Sweden. He is elected Prime Minister by the Swedish Riksdag on March 15.
 March 3 – The first paper is published describing the atomic force microscope invented the previous year by Gerd Binnig, Calvin Quate and Christopher Berger.
 March 8 – The Japanese Suisei probe flies by Halley's Comet, studying its UV hydrogen corona and solar wind.
 March 9 – United States Navy divers find the largely intact but heavily damaged crew compartment of the Space Shuttle Challenger; the bodies of all seven astronauts are still inside.
 March 13 – In a Black Sea incident, American cruiser USS Yorktown and the destroyer USS Caron, claiming the right of innocent passage, enter the Soviet territorial waters near the southern Crimean Peninsula.
 March 14 – Microsoft Corporation holds its initial public offering of stock shares.
 March 15 – Hotel New World collapses, 33 killed and 17 rescued from rubble.
 March 25 – The 58th Academy Awards are held in Los Angeles, with Out of Africa winning Best Picture.
 March 26 – An article in The New York Times charges that Kurt Waldheim, former United Nations Secretary-General and candidate for president of Austria, may have been involved in Nazi war crimes during World War II.
 March 27 – Russell Street Bombing: A car bomb explodes at Russell Street Police Headquarters in Russell Street, Melbourne, killing a woman constable, the first Australian policewoman to be killed in the line of duty.
 March 31 – Mexicana Flight 940 crashes near Maravatío, Mexico, killing 167.

April
 April – The government of Ivory Coast requests international diplomatic use of the French form of its name, Côte d'Ivoire.
 April 1 – Sector Kanda: Communist Party of Nepal (Mashal) cadres attack a number of police stations in Kathmandu, seeking to incite a popular rebellion.
 April 2 – A bomb explodes on a Trans World Airlines flight from Rome to Athens, killing 4 people.
 April 5
 1986 Berlin discotheque bombing: The West Berlin discothèque La Belle, a known hangout for United States soldiers, is bombed, killing three and injuring 230; Libya is held responsible.
 April 11 – The infamous FBI shootout in Miami results in the death of two FBI agents and the wounding of five others.
 April 13 – Pope John Paul II officially visits the Great Synagogue of Rome, the first time a modern Pope has visited a synagogue.
 April 13 – The first child born to a non-related surrogate mother is born.
 April 14 – Hailstones weighing  fall on Gopalganj District, Bangladesh, killing 92.
 April 15 – Operation El Dorado Canyon: At least 15 people die after United States planes bomb targets in the Libyan capital, Tripoli, and the Benghazi region.
 April 16 – The United Kingdom and the Kingdom of the Netherlands sign a peace treaty, thus ending the Three Hundred and Thirty Five Years' War, one of the longest wars in human history.
 April 17
 Lebanon hostage crisis: British journalist John McCarthy is kidnapped in Beirut (he is released in August 1991) and three others are killed in retaliation for the bombing of Libya.
 The Hindawi affair begins when an Irishwoman is found carrying explosives onto an El Al flight from London to Tel Aviv.
 An alleged state of war lasting 335 years between the Netherlands and the Isles of Scilly declared peace bringing an end to any hypothetical war that may have been legally considered to exist.
 April 18 – Titan 34D-9 explodes just after launch while carrying the final KH-9 satellite.
April 21 – Lorimar-Telepictures launches as a mass media company.
 April 26 – Chernobyl disaster: A mishandled safety test at the Chernobyl Nuclear Power Plant in Pripyat, Ukrainian SSR, Soviet Union "killed at least 4,056 people and damaged almost $7 billion of property". Radioactive fallout from the accident is concentrated near Belarus, Ukraine and Russia and at least 350,000 people are forcibly resettled away from these areas. After the accident, "traces of radioactive deposits unique to Chernobyl were in nearly every country in the northern hemisphere".
 April 29 – The Diamond Jubilee of Hirohito is held at the Kokugikan in Tokyo.

May

 May 2 – Expo 86, the 1986 World Exposition on Transportation and Communication, a World's fair, opens in Vancouver, British Columbia, Canada.
 May 8 – Óscar Arias is inaugurated into his first term as President of Costa Rica.
 May 12 – NBC unveils its current peacock logo at the finale of its 60th anniversary special.
 May 16
 The Seville Statement on Violence is adopted by an international meeting of scientists, convened by the Spanish National Commission for UNESCO, in Seville, Spain.
 Paramount Pictures releases Top Gun.
 May 23 – Somali President Siad Barre is injured in a car accident in Mogadishu and taken to Saudi Arabia for treatment. Somali opposition groups see this as an opportunity to try to remove Barre, beginning the Somali Civil War.
 May 25
 Hands Across America: At least 5,000,000 people form a human chain from New York City to Long Beach, California, to raise money to fight hunger and homelessness.
 The Bangladeshi double-decked ferry Shamia capsizes in the Meghna River, southern Barisal, Bangladesh, killing at least 600.

June

 June – Construction of the Oosterscheldekering, the world's largest openable storm surge flood barrier, is completed in the Netherlands.
 June 4 – Jonathan Pollard pleads guilty to espionage for selling top secret United States military intelligence to Israel.
 June 8 – Former United Nations Secretary-General Kurt Waldheim is elected president of Austria.
 June 9 – The Rogers Commission releases its report on the Space Shuttle Challenger disaster.
 June 12 – South Africa declares a nationwide state of emergency.
 June 14 – Fantasyland's Mindbender derails and kills three people.
 June 22 – In one of the most famous FIFA World Cup matches, Argentinian football player Diego Maradona scores one handball goal (nicknamed the "Hand of God") and then dribbles past the entire English football team to score a second goal (nicknamed "The Goal of the Century") with Argentina winning 2–1 against England.
 June 23 – Eric Thomas develops LISTSERV, the first email list management software.
 June 29 – Argentina defeats West Germany 3–2 to win the 1986 World Cup in Estadio Azteca in Mexico City.

July

 July 2 – Walt Disney Pictures releases the company's 26th animated film, The Great Mouse Detective.
 July 4 – The Statue of Liberty is reopened to the public after celebrating its centennial and an extensive refurbishment.
 July 7 – Australian drug smugglers Kevin Barlow and Brian Chambers are executed in Malaysia.
 July 11 – The New Zealand Homosexual Law Reform Act decriminalizes consensual sex between men from the age of 16.
 July 23 – In London, Prince Andrew, Duke of York marries Sarah Ferguson at Westminster Abbey.

August
 August 6
 A low-pressure system moving from South Australia and redeveloping off the New South Wales coast dumps a record  of rain in a day on Sydney.
 Australian Democrats leader Don Chipp retires from federal parliament and is succeeded by Janine Haines, the first woman to lead a political party in Australia.
 August 16  – Typhoon Wayne formed over the South China Sea, going on to become one of the longest-lived tropical cyclones at 21 days, and kill 490.
 August 19 – Two weeks after it was stolen, the Picasso painting Weeping Woman is found in a locker at the Spencer Street Station in Melbourne, Australia.
 August 20 – In Edmond, Oklahoma, United States Postal Service employee Patrick Sherrill guns down 14 of his coworkers before committing suicide.
 August 21 – The Lake Nyos disaster, a limnic eruption, occurs in Cameroon, killing nearly 2,000 people.
 August 31
 The Soviet passenger liner  collides with the bulk carrier Pyotr Vasev in the Black Sea and sinks almost immediately, killing 398.
 Aeroméxico Flight 498, a Douglas DC-9, collides with a Piper PA-28 over Cerritos, California, killing 82 (67 on both aircraft and 15 on the ground).
 The cargo ship Khian Sea departs from the docks of Philadelphia, carrying 14,000 tons of toxic waste. It wanders the seas for the next 16 months trying to find a place to dump its cargo. The waste is later dumped in Haiti.

September

 September 1 – Jordan University of Science and Technology is established in Jordan.
 September 4 – Eusko Alkartasuna, the Basque Social Democratic Party, is created in Vitoria-Gasteiz.
 September 5 – Pan Am Flight 73, with 358 people on board, is hijacked at Karachi International Airport by four Abu Nidal terrorists.
 September 6
 The Big Mac Index is introduced in The Economist newspaper as a semi-humorous international measure of purchasing power parity.
 In Istanbul, two Abu Nidal terrorists kill 22 and wound 6 inside the Neve Shalom Synagogue during Shabbat services.
 September 7
 Desmond Tutu becomes the first black Anglican Church bishop in South Africa.
 Chilean dictator Augusto Pinochet survives an assassination attempt by the FPMR; 5 of Pinochet's bodyguards are killed.
 September 13 – The 6.0  Kalamata earthquake shook southern Greece with a maximum Mercalli intensity of X (Extreme). The shock left at least 20 dead, 300 injured, and caused $5 million in damage.
 September 28 – The Democratic Progressive Party is founded. It was part of the Tangwai movement in the new generation to challenge Kuomintang in Taiwan's one-party politics, and is currently one of only two parties to win presidential elections in Taiwan.

October
 October 1 – U.S. President Ronald Reagan signs the Goldwater–Nichols Act into law, making official the largest reorganization of the United States Department of Defense since the Air Force was made a separate branch of service in 1947.
 October 3 – TASCC, a superconducting cyclotron, officially opens at Chalk River Laboratories. A hybrid solar eclipse was visible off the coast of Iceland, and was the 53rd solar eclipse of Solar Saros 124.
 October 9
 United States District Court Judge Harry E. Claiborne becomes the fifth federal official to be removed from office through impeachment.
 News Corporation completes its acquisition of the Metromedia group of companies, thereby launching the Fox Broadcasting Company.
 The Phantom of the Opera, the longest running Broadway show in history, opens at Her Majesty's Theatre in London.
 October 10 – The 5.7  San Salvador earthquake shook San Salvador, El Salvador with a maximum Mercalli intensity of IX (Violent). Up to 1,500 people were killed.
 October 11–12 – Cold War: Ronald Reagan and Soviet leader Mikhail Gorbachev meet in Reykjavík, Iceland, to continue discussions about scaling back their intermediate missile arsenals in Europe, which end in failure.
 October 16 – The International Olympic Committee chooses Albertville, France to be the host city of the 1992 Winter Olympics and Barcelona, Spain to be the host city of the 1992 Summer Olympics. The IOC also announces that the summer and winter games will separate with the winter games on every even, common year; and the summer games on every leap year starting from 1992.
 October 19 – Mozambican President Samora Machel's plane crashes in South Africa.
 October 21 – The Marshall Islands became an associated state under the Compact of Free Association.
 October 22 – In New York City, WNBC Radio's traffic helicopter crashes into the Hudson River, killing traffic reporter Jane Dornacker. The last words heard on-the-air are Dornacker's screams of terror, "Hit the water! Hit the water! Hit the water!"
 October 26
 Bus deregulation goes into effect in the United Kingdom, except Greater London and Northern Ireland.
 The state funeral of President Samora Machel of Mozambique takes place in Maputo.
 October 27 
 The New York Mets win 4 games to 3 in the 1986 World Series against the Boston Red Sox.
 October 29 – British Prime Minister Margaret Thatcher officially opens the M25 Motorway, which encircles Greater London, in a ceremony on the carriageway near Potters Bar. It became Europe's second longest orbital road upon completion, and provides the first and only full bypass of London.
 October 30 – The National Park Passport Stamps program begins in the United States.

November

 November 1
 Queensland, Australia: Joh Bjelke-Petersen wins his final election as Premier of Queensland with 38.6% of the vote. He resigns on December 1, 1987, following revelations of his involvement with corruption released in the Fitzgerald Inquiry.
 Sandoz chemical spill: A major environmental disaster near Basel, Switzerland pollutes the Rhine, when an agrochemical storehouse catches on fire.
 November 3
 Iran–Contra affair: The Lebanese magazine Ash-Shiraa reports that the United States has been selling weapons to Iran in secret, in order to secure the release of 7 American hostages held by pro-Iranian groups in Lebanon.
 The Northern Mariana Islands enter in a political union with the United States. The island's government adopted its own constitution in 1977, and the constitutional government took office in January 1978. The covenant was fully implemented November 3, 1986, pursuant to Presidential Proclamation no. 5564, which conferred United States citizenship on legally qualified island residents.
 November 6
 45 people are killed in the 1986 British International Helicopters Chinook crash.
 Alex Ferguson is appointed as the new manager of Manchester United.
 November 18
Greater Manchester Police announce that they will search for the bodies of 2 missing children (who both vanished more than 20 years ago) after the Moors murderers Ian Brady and Myra Hindley confess to 2 more murders.
 November 21
Iran-Contra Affair: National Security Council member Oliver North and his secretary, Fawn Hall, start shredding documents implicating them in selling weapons to Iran and channeling the proceeds to help fund the Contra rebels in Nicaragua.

December
 December 7 – A magnitude 5.7 earthquake destroys most of the Bulgarian town of Strajica, killing 2 people.
 December 14 – Rutan Voyager, an experimental aircraft designed by Burt Rutan and piloted by Dick Rutan and Jeana Yeager, begins its flight around the world from Edwards Air Force Base in the United States.
 December 16 – Jeltoqsan, mass anti-government protests, break out across the Kazakh SSR, resulting in the massacre of over 165 protesters.
 December 19 – Soviet dissident Andrei Sakharov is permitted to return to Moscow after six years of internal exile.
 December 20 – Three African Americans are assaulted by a group of white teens in the Howard Beach neighborhood of Queens, New York. One of the victims, Michael Griffith, is run over and killed by a motorist while attempting to flee the attackers.
 December 23 – Rutan Voyager completes the first nonstop circumnavigation of the earth by air without refueling in 9 days, 3 minutes and 44 seconds.
 December 31
 Dupont Plaza Hotel arson: A hotel fire in San Juan, Puerto Rico, kills 97 and injures 140.
 Soviet submarine Krasnoyarsk (K-173) is commissioned.

Date unknown
 Average per capita income in Japan exceeds that in the United States.
 The first commercially available 3D printer is sold.
 Informal stock trading is done in Shenyang, China; the first of its kind in Communist China.
Opus Pro, a Latvian hard rock group, is established.
The band Sweet Children (now known as Green Day) was formed by the lead singer, Billie Joe Armstrong. 
The Province of Flevoland is established in the Netherlands.

Births
Those born in the year 1986 are considered millennials (Generation Y or Gen Y).

January

 January 1
 Pablo Cuevas, Uruguayan tennis player
 Glen Davis, American basketball player
 Lee Sung-min, South Korean actor and singer
 Colin Morgan, Northern Irish actor
 January 2
 Yulia, Russian-New Zealander classical crossover singer
 Nathan Cowen, New Zealand rower
 Nicole Reinhardt, German canoeist
 Trombone Shorty, American jazz musician
 January 4
 Katrina Halili, Filipina actress and commercial model
 Andrei Krauchanka, Belarusian decathlete
 Hsieh Su-wei, Taiwanese tennis player
 James Milner, English soccer player
 January 5
 Teppei Koike, Japanese singer and actor
 Deepika Padukone, Indian actress and producer
 Yana Shemyakina, Ukrainian fencer
 January 6
 Paul McShane, Irish professional footballer
 Petter Northug, Norwegian Olympic skier
 Irina Shayk, Russian model
 Peng Shuai, Chinese tennis player
 Michelle Waterson, American mixed martial artist and model
 Alex Turner, English musician
 January 8
 Jaclyn Linetsky, Canadian actress and voice actress (d. 2003)
 David Silva, Spanish footballer
 January 10
 Abbey Clancy, English model
 Kirsten Flipkens, Belgian tennis player
 Chen Jin, Chinese badminton player
 Suzanne Harmes, Dutch artistic gymnast
 Kenneth Vermeer, Dutch footballer
 January 12 
 Jakob Oftebro, Norwegian actor
 Zlata Ognevich, Ukrainian singer
 Dani Osvaldo, Argentine born-Italian footballer
 January 13 
 Laura Ludwig, German beach volleyball player
 Joannie Rochette, Canadian figure skater
 January 14 – Yohan Cabaye, French footballer
 January 15 – Jessy Schram, American actress
 January 16 – Paula Pareto, Argentinian judoka
 January 17
 Max Adler, American actor
 Chloe Rose Lattanzi, Australian actress and singer
 January 18
 Marya Roxx, Estonian musician
 Becca Tobin, American actress and singer
 January 19 – Claudio Marchisio, Italian footballer
 January 20 – Genie Chuo, Taiwanese singer and actress
 January 21 
 Jonathan Quick, American Ice Hockey player
 Sushant Singh Rajput, Indian actor (d. 2020)
 January 23
 José Enrique, Spanish footballer
 Michael Stevens, American scientist and entertainer
 January 24
 Mischa Barton, British-American actress
 Raviv Ullman, Israeli-American actor, director, and musician
 January 26
 Gerald Green, American basketball player
 Matt Heafy, American musician
 Kim Jae-joong, South Korean actor and pop singer
 Taylor Wilde, Canadian professional wrestler
 January 28
 Dame Jessica Ennis-Hill, British heptathlete
 Shruti Haasan, Indian actress and musician
 January 29
 Drew Tyler Bell, American actor and dancer
 Sarah Jaffe, American singer

February

 February 1 – Lauren Conrad, American television personality and fashion designer
 February 2
 Gemma Arterton, British actress
 Miwa Asao, Japanese beach volleyball player
 February 5
 Kevin Gates, American hip-hop musician and entrepreneur
 Madison Rayne, American professional wrestler
 Billy Sharp, English footballer
 February 6
 Vedran Ćorluka, Croatian international footballer
 Dane DeHaan, American actor
 Alice Greczyn, American actress and model
 Sofia Nizharadze, Georgian pop musician
 Yunho, South Korean actor and singer
 February 8
 Anna Hutchison, New Zealand actress
 Anderson .Paak, American musician and record producer
 February 9 – Ciprian Tătărușanu, Romanian footballer
 February 10
 Radamel Falcao, Colombian footballer
 Yui Ichikawa, Japanese actress
 Viktor Troicki, Serbian tennis player
 February 11 – Gabriel Boric, President of Chile
 February 12 – Valorie Curry, American actress
 February 13 – Hamish Bond, New Zealand rower
 February 14
 Aschwin Wildeboer, Spanish swimmer
 Tiffany Thornton, American actress, radio personality and singer
 February 15
 Valeri Bojinov, Bulgarian footballer
 Ami Koshimizu, Japanese voice actress
 Amber Riley, American actress, singer and author
 February 16 
 Jessica von Bredow-Werndl, German dressage rider
 Diego Godín, Uruguayan footballer
 February 17 – Brett Kern, American football player
 February 18
 Vika Jigulina, Moldovan born-Romanian music producer, dance singer and DJ
 Alessandra Mastronardi, Italian actress
  Gregory Vargas, Venezuelan basketball player
 February 19
 Björn Gustafsson, Swedish comedian
 Ophelia Lovibond, British actress
 Marta, Brazilian-born footballer
 Maria Mena, Norwegian pop singer
 February 21
 Prince Amedeo of Belgium, Archduke of Austria-Este, member of the Belgian Royal Family
 Charlotte Church, Welsh singer, actress, and television presenter
 February 22
 Miko Hughes, American actor
 Rajon Rondo, American Basketball Player
 February 23
 Skylar Grey, American pop singer
 Kazuya Kamenashi, Japanese singer-songwriter and actor
 Jerod Mayo, American football player
 Ola Svensson, Swedish pop singer
 February 24 – Milcah Chemos Cheywa, Kenyan middle-distance runner
 February 25
 Danny Saucedo, Swedish pop and dance singer
 Justin Berfield, American actor, writer, and producer
 James and Oliver Phelps, English actors
 February 26
 Leila Lopes, Angolan Miss Universe
 Crystal Kay, Japanese actress and pop singer
 Teresa Palmer, Australian actress, writer, model and film producer

March

 March 1
 Ayumu Goromaru, Japanese rugby union player
 Jonathan Spector, American soccer player
 March 2 – Ethan Peck, American actor
 March 3
 Stacie Orrico, American singer
 Mehmet Topal, Turkish footballer
 March 4 – Margo Harshman, American actress
 March 5
 Corey Brewer, American basketball player
 Julie Henderson, American model
 Sarah J. Maas, American novelist
 Mika Newton, Ukrainian singer
 Shikabala, Egyptian footballer
 March 6
 Francisco Cervelli, Venezuelan baseball player
 Eli Marienthal, American actor
 Charlie Mulgrew, Scottish footballer
 Lucas Saatkamp, Brazilian volleyball player
 March 8
 Tal Slutzker, Israeli painter and poet
 Princess Tsuguko of Takamado, member of the Japanese Imperial Family
 March 9 – Brittany Snow, American actress, producer, director and singer
 March 11
 Dario Cologna, Swiss Olympic skier
 Mariko Shinoda, Japanese singer, actress, fashion model, and idol
 March 12
 Danny Jones, British musician
 František Rajtoral, Czech footballer (d. 2017)
 March 13 – Silvija Popović, Serbian volleyball player
 March 14 – Jamie Bell, English actor and dancer
 March 15 – Jai Courtney, Australian actor
 March 16
 Alexandra Daddario, American actress
 Ken Doane, American professional wrestler
 Daisuke Takahashi, Japanese figure skater
 March 17
 Edin Džeko, Bosnian footballer
 Olesya Rulin, Russian-born actress
 March 18 
 Lykke Li, Swedish singer-songwriter
 Cory Schneider, American Ice Hockey player
 March 19 – Anne Vyalitsyna, Russian model
 March 20 – Ruby Rose, Australian actress and model
 March 21
 Scott Eastwood, American actor
 Michu, Spanish footballer
 March 23
 Brett Eldredge, American country music singer
 Steven Strait, American musician, actor, and fashion model
 March 24 
 Valentin Chmerkovskiy, Ukrainian-American dancer
 Nathalia Dill, Brazilian actress
 Anxhela Peristeri, Albanian singer and songwriter
 March 25
 Marco Belinelli, Italian basketball player
 Megan Gibson, American softball player
 Kyle Lowry, American basketball player
 March 26
 Jonny Craig, Canadian-American singer
 Jessica Hart, Australian model
 Misty Stone, American pornographic actress
Alexander Taraikovsky, Belarusian demonstrator (d. 2020)
 March 27
 SoCal Val, American professional wrestling personality
 Manuel Neuer, German football goalkeeper
 March 28
 Lady Gaga, American singer, songwriter and actress
 Bowe Bergdahl, American soldier and deserter captured by the Taliban
 Amaia Salamanca, Spanish actress and model
 Barbora Strýcová, Czech tennis player
 March 29
 Lucas Elliot Eberl, American actor and director
 Romina Oprandi, Italian tennis player
 March 30
 Beni, Japanese singer
 Tessa Ferrer, American actress
 Sergio Ramos, Spanish footballer

April

 April 1
 Kid Ink, American hip-hop musician
 Özge Özpirinçci, Turkish actress
 Hillary Scott, American musician
 Ireen Wüst, Dutch speed skater
 April 2
 Lee DeWyze, American rock musician
 Drew Van Acker, American actor
 April 3
 Amanda Bynes, American actress and fashion designer
 Coleen Rooney, English media personality
 April 4
 Eunhyuk, South Korean actor and singer
 Labinot Harbuzi, Swedish footballer (d. 2018)
 Jason Richardson, American hurdler
 April 7 
 Choi Si-won, South Korean actor and singer
 Yu Yang, Chinese badminton player
 April 8
 Igor Akinfeev, Russian footballer
 Cliff Avril, American football player
 Félix Hernández, Venezuelan baseball player
 Natalia Ishchenko, Russian synchronized swimmer
 Erika Sawajiri, Japanese actress, singer, and model
 April 9
 Leighton Meester, American actress
 Jordan Masterson, American actor
 April 10
 Sam Attwater, British actor
 Fernando Gago, Argentine footballer
 Vincent Kompany, Belgian footballer
 April 12 
 Blerim Džemaili, SR Macedonia-born Swiss footballer
 Marcel Granollers, Spanish tennis player
 Matt McGorry, American actor and activist
 April 14 – Thaila Ayala, Brazilian actress and model
 April 15 – Tom Heaton, English footballer
 April 16
 Sufe Bradshaw, American actress
 Shinji Okazaki, Japanese football player
 Paul Di Resta, British racing driver
 April 17
 Romain Grosjean, French racing driver
 Zheng Kai, Chinese actor
 April 18 – Maurice Edu, American footballer
 April 19 – Candace Parker, American basketball player
 April 22
 Amber Heard, American actress
 Marshawn Lynch, American football player
 April 23 
 Sven Kramer, Dutch speed skater
 Jessica Stam, Canadian model
 April 24 – Tahyna Tozzi, Australian model, singer and actress 
 April 25
 Gwen Jorgensen, American triathlete
 Daniel Sharman, English actor
 April 26 – Juan Sebastián Cabal, Colombian tennis player
 April 27
 Jenna Coleman, British actress
 Dinara Safina, Russian tennis player
 April 28
 Jenna Ushkowitz, American stage and television actress and singer
 Jazmín Beccar Varela, Argentine actress
 April 30 
 Dianna Agron, American actress, singer and dancer
 Zhang Nan, Chinese artistic gymnast

May

 May 1
 Christian Benítez, Ecuadorian footballer (d. 2013)
Jesse Klaver, Dutch politician
 Diego Valeri, Argentine footballer
 Cassie Jaye, American actress and film director
 May 2
 Sani Kaita, Nigerian footballer
 Thomas McDonell, American actor, musician, and artist
 May 5 – Grace Wong, Hong Kong actress and beauty pageant contestant
 May 6
 Gims, Congolese born-French rapper
 Tyler Hynes, Canadian actor and film maker
 Sasheer Zamata, American actress and comedian
 May 8 
 Galen Rupp, American ling distance and marathon runner
 Laura Spencer, American actress
 May 10 – Fernanda Garay, Brazilian volleyball player
 May 12
 Jonathan Orozco, Mexican footballer
 Christinna Pedersen, Danish badminton player
 Emily VanCamp, Canadian actress
 May 13
 Lena Dunham, American actress and producer
 Robert Pattinson, English actor and musician
 Alexander Rybak, Norwegian singer and violinist
 Nino Schurter, Swiss mountain bike cyclist
 May 14
 Alyosha, Ukrainian singer
 Mey Chan, Indonesian singer
 Marco Motta, Italian footballer
 Camila Sodi, Mexican actress, singer and model
 May 15 – Matías Fernández, Chilean footballer
 May 16
 Drew Roy, American actor
 Megan Fox, American actress and model
 Shamcey Supsup, Filipina beauty queen, host and pageant director
 May 17
 Amy Gumenick, Swedish actress
 Tahj Mowry, American actor and singer
 Eric Lloyd, American actor, comedian, musician and producer
 Erin Richards, Welsh actress, director and writer
 May 18 
 Kevin Anderson, South African tennis player
 Natalia Osipova, Russian ballerina
 May 20 – Louisa Krause, American actress
 May 21
 Kevin Kraxner, former Austrian ice hockey player
 Ricardo Lockette, American football player
 Mario Mandžukić, Croatian footballer
 May 22
 Thandeka Mdeliswa, South African actress (d. 2020)
 Julian Edelman, American football player
 Molly Ephraim, American actress
 Tatiana Volosozhar, Ukrainian-born Russian figure skater
 May 23
 Nico Colaluca, American footballer
 Ryan Coogler, American film director, producer, and screenwriter
 Valentina Marchei, Italian figure skater
 Jordan Zimmermann, American baseball player
 May 24 
 Mark Ballas, American dancer, actor, and musician
 Carolina Rodriguez, Spanish rhythmic gymnast
 May 25
 Neon Hitch, English singer
 Geraint Thomas, Welsh racing cyclist 
 Juri Ueno, Japanese actress
 May 26 
 Àstrid Bergès-Frisbey, Spanish actress and model
 Nao Kodaira, Japanese speed skater
 May 27 – Timo Descamps, Belgian actor and singer
 May 28
 Joseph Cross, American actor
 Bryant Dunston, American-Armenian basketball player
 Charles N'Zogbia, French footballer
 Britt McHenry, American sports reporter
 Seth Rollins, American professional wrestler
 May 29
 Hornswoggle, American professional wrestler and actor
 Eleazar Gómez, Mexican actor
 Jaslene Gonzalez, Puerto Rican fashion model
 May 30
 Will Peltz, American actor
 Pasha Parfeni, Moldovan singer
 May 31
 Brooke Castile, American figure skater
 Robert Gesink, Dutch cyclist
 Sopho Khalvashi, Georgian musician
 Melissa McIntyre, Canadian actress

June

 June 1
 Ricardo Abarca, Mexican actor and singer
 Moses Ndiema Masai, Kenyan runner
 Dayana Mendoza, Venezuelan model and beauty queen
 Chinedu Obasi, Nigerian footballer
 Skream, British DJ and producer
 Ben Smith, New Zealand rugby player
 June 2
 Todd Carney, Australian rugby player
 Curtis Lofton, American football player
 June 3
 Al Horford, Dominican basketball player
 Micah Kogo, Kenyan runner
 Rafael Nadal, Spanish tennis player
 Josh Segarra, American actor
 Adrián Vallés, Spanish race car driver
 Tomáš Verner, Czech Republic ice skater
 June 4
 Oona Chaplin, Spanish-English actress and dancer
 Fahriye Evcen, German-Turkish actress
 Shane Kippel, Canadian actor
 Shelly Woods, British wheelchair racer
 Yoochun, South Korean musician and actor
 June 5
 Christian Baracat, German rugby player
 Dave Bolland, Canadian ice hockey player
 Amanda Crew, Canadian actress
 Vernon Gholston, American football player
 June 6
 Justin Allgaier, American race car driver
 Kim Hyun-joong, South Korean actor, model and singer
 Junichi Tazawa, Japanese-American baseball player
 Leslie Carter, American pop singer (d. 2012)
 June 9 – Adamo Ruggiero, Canadian actor
 June 10
 Hajime Hosogai, Japanese footballer
 Joey Zimmerman, American actor and musician
 June 11 – Shia LaBeouf, American actor, performance artist, and filmmaker
 June 12
 Benjamin Schmideg, Australian actor
 Cintia Dicker, Brazilian model
 Jessica Keenan Wynn, American actress
 Luke Youngblood, British actor
 Mario Casas, Spanish actor
 Gary Buckland, Welsh former professional boxer of Romani descent 
 June 13
 Kat Dennings, American actress
 DJ Snake, French DJ and producer
 Keisuke Honda, Japanese football player
 Ashley Olsen, American actress
 Mary-Kate Olsen, American actress
 Onuma Sittirak, Thai volleyball player
 Måns Zelmerlöw, Swedish pop singer and television presenter
 June 14 – Haley Hudson, American actress
 June 15 – Momoko Ueda, Japanese golfer
 June 16 – Fernando Muslera, Uruguayan footballer
 June 17
 Marie Avgeropoulos, Canadian actress and model
 Lisa Haydon, Indian actress
 June 18
 Richard Gasquet, French tennis player
 Richard Madden, Scottish actor
 Shusaku Nishikawa, Japanese footballer
 Meaghan Rath, Canadian film and television actress
 Crystal Renn, American model and author
 June 19 – Marvin Williams, American basketball player
 June 20 – Dreama Walker, American actress
 June 21 – Cheick Tioté, Ivorian footballer (d. 2017)
 June 23
 Marti Malloy, American judoka
 Simon Špilak, Slovenian road bicycle racer
 Colin Ryan, English actor
 June 24
 Stuart Broad, English cricketer
 Solange Knowles, American actress and singer
 Bojana Stamenov, Serbian singer
 June 25
 Lee Ho-suk, South Korean short-track skater
 Ace Mahbaz, Iranian actor and writer
 June 26 – Mohd Farizal Marlias, Malaysian footballer
 June 27
 Drake Bell, American actor, voice actor, singer, songwriter, and musician
 Sam Claflin, British actor
 LaShawn Merritt, American sprinter
 June 28
 Suzuko Mimori, Japanese voice actress and singer
 Kellie Pickler, American singer
 Shadia Simmons, Canadian actress
 Maya Stojan, Swiss actress
 June 29
 Christopher Egan, Australian actor
 Edward Maya, Romanian musician
 Iya Villania, Filipina TV personality
 June 30 – Alicia Fox, American professional wrestler and model

July

 July 1 – Charlie Blackmon, American baseball player
 July 2
 Lindsay Lohan, American actress, singer-songwriter, businesswoman, fashion designer, and film producer
 Bruno Rezende, Brazilian volleyball player
 Kseniya Sydorenko, Ukrainian synchronized swimmer
 Katie Taylor, Irish boxer
 July 3 
 Oscar Ustari, Argentine footballer
 Felixia Yeap, Malaysian model
 July 4 – Takahisa Masuda, Japanese actor and singer
 July 5
 Iurii Cheban, Ukrainian canoe sprinter
 Ashkan Dejagah, Iranian footballer
 July 7 
 Ana Kasparian, American progressive political commentator, media host, and journalist
 Sevyn Streeter, American singer
 July 8
 Kaiane Aldorino, Gibraltarian politician, beauty queen who won Miss World 2009
 Renata Costa, Brazilian footballer
 Jake McDorman, American film and television actor
 July 9 – Kiely Williams, American actress and singer
 July 10
 Shintaro Yamada, Japanese fashion model, actor and singer
 Wyatt Russell, American actor
 Tom Richards, English squash player
 July 11 – Raúl García, Spanish footballer
 July 12 – JP Pietersen, South African rugby player
 July 13 – Stanley Weber, French actor and theatre director
 July 14
 Sanam Baloch, Pakistani VJ, actress and anchor
 Peta Murgatroyd, New Zealand-born Australian dancer
 Dan Smith, British singer
 Ambruse Vanzekin, Nigerian footballer
 July 15 – Mishael Morgan, Canadian actress
 July 17
 Dana, Korean singer, dancer and actress
 Mojo Rawley, American professional wrestler and former American professional football player
 Brando Eaton, American film and television actor
 July 18
 James Sorensen, Australian model and actor
 Travis Milne, Canadian actor
 July 19 – Jinder Mahal, Canadian professional wrestler
 July 20 – Osric Chau, Canadian actor and martial artist
 July 21
 Livia Brito, Cuban-Mexican actress and model
 Betty Gilpin, American actress
 Diane Guerrero, American actress
 July 23
 Aya Uchida, Japanese voice actress
 Ayaka Komatsu, Japanese actress, model and gravure idol
 July 24
 Vugar Gashimov, Azerbaijani chess grandmaster (d. 2014)
 Megan Park, Canadian actress and singer
 Natalie Tran, Australian comedian
 Remy Hii, Malaysian-Australian actor
 July 25 – Hulk, Brazilian footballer
 July 26 – Monica Raymund, American actress
 July 28
 Alexandra Chando, American actress
 Nolan Gerard Funk, Canadian actor and singer
 July 31
 Sean Eldridge, Canadian-born American political and gay activist 
 Paola Espinosa, Mexican diver
 Evgeni Malkin, Russian hockey player

August

 August 1
 Josh Harder, American politician
 Elena Vesnina, Russian tennis player
 August 3
 Charlotte Casiraghi, Monegasque heiress, royal and socialite
 Prince Louis of Luxembourg, Prince of Luxembourg
 August 4 – Oleg Ivanov, Russian footballer
 August 5
 Paula Creamer, American golfer
 Kyoko Oshima, Japanese artistic gymnast
 August 6 
 Nanna Blondell, Swedish actress
 Bryan Young, Canadian ice hockey player
 August 7
 Altaír Jarabo, Mexican actress and model
 Paul Biedermann, German swimmer
 August 8
 Kateryna Volodko, Ukrainian tennis player
 Jackie Cruz, Dominican-American actress
 Peyton List, American actress
 Paula Forteza, French-Argentine politician
 August 11
 Kaori Fukuhara, Japanese voice actress
 Colby Rasmus, American baseball player
 August 13 – Demetrious Johnson, American mixed martial artist  and former 11-time UFC Flyweight World Champion, and also the current ONE Flyweight World Champion
 August 14 – Nigel Boogaard, Australian footballer
 August 15 – Teddy Sinclair, English singer-songwriter
 August 16 
 Yu Darvish, Japanese baseball player
 Sarah Pavan, Canadian beach volleyball player
 August 18 
 Antonin Rouzier, French volleyball player
 Miesha Tate, American professional mixed martial artist
 August 19 
 Christina Perri, American pop and rock musician
 Tian Qing, Chinese badminton player
 August 20 – Ryo Katsuji, Japanese actor and voice actor
 August 21
 Usain Bolt, Jamaican sprinter
 Brooks Wheelan, American actor, comedian and writer
 August 22
 Keiko Kitagawa, Japanese actress
 Benjamin Satterley, English professional wrestler
 August 23
 Ayron Jones, American musician
 Neil Cicierega, American Internet artist
 Andra, Romanian singer
 August 26 
 Big K.R.I.T., American rapper
 Cassie Ventura, American singer, songwriter, model, actress and dancer
 Saint Jhn, Guyanese-American rapper, singer, songwriter, and record producer
 August 27 – Sebastian Kurz, Austrian politician, 25th Chancellor of Austria
 August 28
 Briggs, Australian rapper
 Armie Hammer, American actor
 Gilad Shalit, Israeli soldier/hostage
 Florence Welch, British singer
 August 29
 Lea Michele, American actress, singer, and author
 Hajime Isayama, Japanese manga artist, and creator of Attack on Titan
 August 30 – Ryan Ross, American guitarist
 August 31
 Melanie Schlanger, Australian freestyle swimmer
 Feng Tianwei, Singaporean table tennis player

September

 September 1 – Jean Sarkozy, French politician
 September 2
 Moses Ndiema Kipsiro, Ugandan middle-distance runner
 Stevan Faddy, Montenegrin singer
 September 3
 OMI, Jamaican-born singer
 Shaun White, American professional snowboarder
 September 4
 Jaclyn Hales, American actress
 Xavier Woods, American professional wrestler
 September 5 – Francis Ngannou, Cameroonian Professional MMA Fighter
 September 7 – Charlie Daniels, English footballer
 September 8
 Leah LaBelle, Canadian-born American singer (d. 2018)
 Jake Sandvig, American actor
 September 9 – José Aldo, Brazilian mixed martial artist
 September 10 – Sarah Levy, Canadian actress
 September 12
 Alfie Allen, English actor
 Yuto Nagatomo, Japanese footballer
 Emmy Rossum, American actress and singer
 Yang Mi, Chinese actress and singer 
 September 13 – Kamui Kobayashi, Japanese professional racing driver
 September 14
 Michelle Jenner, Spanish actress
 Tinchy Stryder, Ghanaian musician
 Ai Takahashi, Japanese singer
 September 15
 Jenna Marbles, American YouTuber
 Heidi Montag, American television personality
 September 16 – Kyla Pratt, American actress
 September 18 
 Keeley Hazell, English model and actress
 Renaud Lavillenie, French pole vaulter
 September 19
 Mandy Musgrave, American actress
 Sally Pearson, Australian athlete
 Ilya Salmanzadeh, Swedish music producer
 Peter Vack, American actor, writer, director and producer
 September 20
 Aldis Hodge, American actor
 Diego Sinagra, Italian footballer
 September 21 – Lindsey Stirling, American violinist, dancer, performance artist, and composer
 September 24
 Leah Dizon, American singer and model
 Eloise Mumford, American actress
 September 25 – Jiang Tingting, Chinese synchronized swimmer
 September 26 – Ashley Leggat, Canadian actress
 September 27 – Natasha Thomas, Danish singer and songwriter
 September 28 – Andrés Guardado, Mexican footballer
 September 30
 Cristián Zapata, Colombian footballer
 Olivier Giroud, French footballer
 Ki Hong Lee, Korean-American actor

October

 October 1
 Sayaka Kanda, Japanese actress and singer (d. 2021)
 Jurnee Smollett, American actress
 October 2
 Camilla Belle, Brazilian-American actress, director, writer and producer
 Kiko Casilla, Spanish footballer
 October 3 – Joonas Suotamo, Finnish basketball player and actor
 October 4 – Nina Vislova, Russian badminton player
 October 5 – Novica Veličković, Serbian basketball player
 October 6
 Luisa D'Oliveira, Canadian actress
 Tereza Kerndlová, Czech singer
 Olivia Thirlby, American actress
 October 7
 Holland Roden, American actress
 Amber Stevens West, American actress and model
 October 9
 Ezequiel Garay, Argentine footballer
Blagoy Ivanov, Bulgarian mixed martial artist
 Laure Manaudou, French swimmer
 October 10
 Lucy Griffiths, English actress
 Nathan Jawai, Australian basketball player
 October 12 
 Tyler Blackburn, American actor, singer and model 
 Cristhian Stuani, Uruguayan footbalelr
 Li Wenliang, Chinese ophthalmologist (he warned about COVID-19) (d. 2020)
 October 13 – Gabby Agbonlahor, English footballer
 October 14
 Wesley Matthews, American basketball player
 Iveta Mukuchyan, Armenian singer, model and actress
 Skyler Shaye, American actress
 October 15
 Ali Fazal, Indian actor
 Paul Walter Hauser, American actor
 Lee Donghae, Korean singer
 October 16
 Franco Armani, Argentine footballer
 Jordan Larson, American volleyball player
 Craig Pickering, English sprinter
 Inna, Romanian singer
 October 17 – Mohombi, Congolese-Swedish urban singer-songwriter and dancer
 October 18 – Loukas Giorkas, Greek-Cypriot singer and model
 October 19 – Monday James, Nigerian footballer
 October 20 – Elyse Taylor, Australian model
 October 21
 Almen Abdi, Serbian born-Swiss footballer
 Tamerlan Tsarnaev, Russian-American terrorist (d. 2013)
 Christopher von Uckermann, Mexican-Swedish singer, songwriter and actor
 October 22
 Kyle Gallner, American actor
 Kara Lang, Canadian footballer
 October 23
 Emilia Clarke, English actress
 Jessica Stroup, American actress and fashion model
 LoLa Monroe, American rapper, model and actress
 October 24
 Drake, Canadian actor and hip-hop rapper
 Nobuhiko Okamoto, Japanese voice actor and singer
 John Ruddy, English footballer
 October 25 – Chiquito Felipe do Carmo, East Timorese football player
 October 27
 Alba Flores, Spanish actress
 Erica Dasher, American actress
 Inbar Lavi, Israeli actress
 October 28
May Calamawy, Egyptian-Palestinian actress
Tamar Kaprelian, Armenian-American musician and singer
 October 29
 Italia Ricci, Canadian actress
 Derek Theler, American actor
 October 30
 Thomas Morgenstern, Austrian Olympic ski jumper
 Hiba Abouk, Spanish-Tunisian actress

November

 November 1 – Penn Badgley, American actor and musician
 November 3
 Davon Jefferson, American  basketball player
 Jasmine Trias, Filipino singer
 Heo Young-Saeng, South Korean singer
 November 4 
 Hanna Jaff, American born-Mexican journalist, media personality and business person
 Alexz Johnson, Canadian actress and singer
 Angelica Panganiban, Filipino-American actress and comedian
 November 5
 Kasper Schmeichel, Danish footballer
 Nodiko Tatishvili, Georgian singer
 November 8 – Aaron Swartz, American programmer (d. 2013)
 November 10
 Nong-O Gaiyanghadao, Thai Muay Thai kickboxer and former ONE Bantamweight Muymay Thai World Champion
 Andy Mientus, American actor, singer, composer and writer
 Josh Peck, American actor and director
 Eric Thames, American baseball player
 Samuel Wanjiru, Kenyan athlete (d. 2011)
 November 11
 François Trinh-Duc, French rugby player
 Greta Salóme Stefánsdóttir, Icelandic singer and violinist
 Radhika Kumaraswamy, Indian actress
 Rafael de la Fuente, Venezuelan actor and singer
 November 12 – Evan Yo, Taiwanese singer-songwriter
 November 13 – Kevin Bridges, Scottish stand-up comedian 
 November 14
 Cory Michael Smith, American actor
 Yuna, Malaysian singer, songwriter, and businesswoman
 November 15
 Winston Duke, Tobagonian actor
 Sania Mirza, Indian tennis player
 November 17
 Karmichael Hunt, New Zealand-Australian sportsperson
 Nani, Cape Verde-born Portuguese footballer
 Greg Rutherford, British athlete
 Alexis Vastine, French boxer (d. 2015)
 November 19 
 Erin Hamlin, American luger
 Dayron Robles, Cuban hurdler
 November 20
 Ashley Fink, American actress and singer
 Oliver Sykes, English musician and vocalist of Bring Me the Horizon
 November 21 – Sam Palladio, British actor and musician
 November 22
 Oscar Pistorius, South African Paralympic runner
 Sebastián Zurita, Mexican actor
 November 24
 Jimmy Graham, American football player
 Pedro León, Spanish soccer player
 Micaela Vázquez, Argentine actress
 November 25 – Katie Cassidy, American singer and model
 November 26 
 Carly Gullickson, American tennis player
 Kanae Ito, Japanese voice actress
 November 27 – Suresh Raina, Indian cricket player
 November 28 – Johnny Simmons, American actor

December

 December 1 – DeSean Jackson, American football player
 Andrew Tate, American-British Internet personality and former professional kickboxer
 December 3 – Leah Wilkinson, British field hockey player
 December 4 – Martell Webster, American basketball player
 December 8
 Amir Khan, British boxer
 Kate Voegele, American singer-songwriter and actress
 December 9 – Aron Baynes, Australian basketball player
 December 11
 Alex House, Canadian actor
 Lee Peltier, English footballer
 Condola Rashād, American actress
 December 15
 Keylor Navas, Costa Rican footballer
 Xiah, Korean singer
 December 17 – Emma Bell, American actress
 December 18 – Jery Sandoval, Colombian actress, model and singer
 December 19
 Ryan Babel, Dutch footballer
 Lauren Boebert, American politician
 Zuzana Hejnová, Czech hurdler
 December 23 – Balázs Dzsudzsák, Hungarian footballer
 December 24
 Ana Brenda Contreras, Mexican actress and singer
 Satomi Ishihara, Japanese actress
 December 26
 Joe Alexander, American-Israeli basketball player
 Mew Azama, Japanese actress
 Kit Harington, British actor
 Selen Soyder, Turkish actress, model and beauty pageant
 December 27
 Jamaal Charles, American football player
 Shelly-Ann Fraser-Pryce, Jamaican sprinter
 Chris Rörland, Swedish metal musician and graphic designer
 December 29 – Kim Ok-bin, South Korean actress and model
 December 30
 Onyekachi Apam, Nigerian footballer
 Ellie Goulding, British singer

Deaths

January

 January 4
 Christopher Isherwood, English writer (b. 1904)
 Phil Lynott, Irish musician, lead singer and bassist (Thin Lizzy) (b. 1949)
 January 5 – Ilmari Salminen, Finnish Olympic athlete (b. 1902)
 January 6 – Una Merkel, American actress (b. 1903)
 January 7 – Juan Rulfo, Mexican writer (b. 1917)
 January 10 – Jaroslav Seifert, Czech writer, Nobel Prize laureate (b. 1901)
 January 12 – Juan Carlos Corazzo, Uruguayan football player (b. 1907)
 January 13 – Abdul Fattah Ismail, Leader of the People's Democratic Republic of Yemen (South Yemen) (b. 1939)
 January 14 – Donna Reed, American actress (b. 1921)
 January 16 – Herbert W. Armstrong, founded the Worldwide Church of God (b. 1892)
 January 17 – Abdul Majid Kubar, 4th Prime Minister of Libya (b. 1909)
 January 23 – Willard Van Dyke, American filmmaker and photographer (b. 1906)
 January 24
 Victor Crutchley, British admiral (b. 1893)
 L. Ron Hubbard, American writer and founder of Scientology (b. 1911)
 Gordon MacRae, American actor and singer (b. 1921)
 January 27
 Nikhil Banerjee, Indian classical sitarist (b. 1931)
 Lilli Palmer, German actress (b. 1914)
 January 28 – In the Challenger disaster:
 Gregory Jarvis, American astronaut (b. 1944)
 Christa McAuliffe, American astronaut and teacher (b. 1948)
 Ronald McNair, American astronaut (b. 1950)
 Ellison Onizuka, American astronaut (b. 1946)
 Judith Resnik, American astronaut (b. 1949)
 Dick Scobee, American astronaut (b. 1939)
 Michael J. Smith, American astronaut (b. 1945)
 January 29 – Leif Erickson, American actor (b. 1911)

February

 February 1
 Alva Myrdal, Swedish politician, diplomat, and writer, recipient of the Nobel Peace Prize (b. 1902)
 Ida Rhodes, American mathematician, pioneer in computer programming (b. 1900)
 February 7
 Minoru Yamasaki, Japanese architect, designed the twin towers of the World Trade Center (b. 1912)
 Cheikh Anta Diop, Senegalese historian, anthropologist, physicist, and politician (b. 1923)
 February 10 – Brian Aherne, British actor (b. 1902)
 February 11 – Frank Herbert, American author (b. 1920)
 February 14 – Edmund Rubbra, British composer (b. 1901)
 February 16 – Howard da Silva, American actor (b. 1909)
 February 17
 Jiddu Krishnamurti, Indian philosopher (b. 1895)
 Paul Stewart, American actor (b. 1908)
 February 19 
 Francisco Mignone, Brazilian classical music (b. 1897)
 Barry Seal, American smuggler of drugs and arms, aircraft pilot, and money launderer and former Trans Worlds Airlines pilot (b. 1939)
 Adolfo Celi, Italian actor and director (b. 1922)
 February 20 – Bert Schneider, Canadian boxer (b. 1897)
 February 21 – Mart Stam, Dutch architect (b. 1899)
 February 24 – Tommy Douglas, Canadian politician and "Father of medicare" in Canada (b. 1904)
 February 25 – Pasquale Festa Campanile, Italian screenwriter, film director and novelist (b. 1927)
 February 27 – Jacques Plante, Canadian hockey player (b. 1929)
 February 28 – Olof Palme, Swedish politician, 26th Prime Minister of Sweden (b. 1927)

March

 March 4
 Richard Manuel, Canadian musician (The Band) (b. 1943)
 Howard Greenfield, American songwriter (b. 1936)
 March 6
 Adolph Caesar, American actor (b. 1933)
 Georgia O'Keeffe, American artist (b. 1887)
 Zhu Guangqian, Chinese esthetician, modern literary theorist, and famous scholar (b.1897)
 March 10 – Ray Milland, Welsh-American actor and director (b. 1907)
 March 13 – Eugen Gerstenmaier, German politician, 20 July Plotter (b. 1906)
 March 15 – Miguel Darío Miranda y Gómez, Mexican Roman Catholic archbishop and cardinal (b. 1895)
 March 17 – John Bagot Glubb, British soldier (b. 1897)
 March 18 – Bernard Malamud, American writer (b. 1914)
 March 19 – Jon Lormer, American actor (b. 1906)
 March 22
 Charles Starrett, American actor (b. 1903)
 Martin Harlinghausen, German air force general (b. 1902)
 March 23
 Moshe Feinstein, Orthodox rabbi (b. 1895)
 Anastasia Zuyeva, Soviet actress (b. 1896)
 March 24 – Michael, Prince of Montenegro (b. 1908)
 March 28 – Virginia Gilmore, American actress (b. 1919)
 March 29 – Harry Ritz, American actor (b. 1907)
 March 30 – James Cagney, American actor and dancer (b. 1899)
 March 31 – Jerry Paris, American actor and director (b. 1925)

April

 April 1 – Erik Bruhn, Danish danseur and choreographer (b. 1928)
 April 3 – Sir Peter Pears, English tenor (b. 1910)
 April 7 – Leonid Kantorovich, Russian economist, Nobel Prize laureate (b. 1912)
 April 8 – Yukiko Okada, Japanese idol singer (b. 1967)
 April 14 – Simone de Beauvoir, French feminist writer (b. 1908)
 April 15
 Jean Genet, French writer (b. 1910)
 Tim McIntire, American actor (b. 1944)
 Robert Marjolin, French economist and politician, 1st Secretary-General of the OECD (b. 1911)
 April 17
 Paul Costello, American Olympic rower – double sculls (b. 1894)
 Marcel Dassault, French aircraft industrialist (b. 1892)
 Bessie Head, South African writer (b. 1937)
 April 19 – Alvin Childress, American actor (b. 1907)
 April 20 – Aleksei Arbuzov, Soviet playwright (b. 1908)
 April 21 – Teodoro Casana Robles, Peruvian lawyer, historian, journalist, archaeologist, photographer and geographer (b. 1900)
 April 22 – Mircea Eliade, Romanian historian of religions and writer (b. 1907)
 April 23
 Harold Arlen, American music composer (b. 1905)
 Jim Laker, English cricketer (b. 1922)
 Otto Preminger, Austrian-American film director (b. 1905)
 April 24 – The Duchess of Windsor (b. 1896)
 April 26
 Broderick Crawford, American actor (b. 1911)
 Bessie Love, American actress (b. 1898)
 Hermann Gmeiner, Austrian educator (b. 1919)
 Valery Khodemchuk, Soviet engineer, working at Chernobyl reactor 4 (b. 1951)
 April 27 – J. Allen Hynek, American ufologist (b. 1910)
 April 30 – Robert Stevenson, English film director (b. 1905)

May

 May 2 – Henri Toivonen, Finnish rally car driver (b. 1956)
 May 3 – Robert Alda, American actor (b. 1914)
 May 7 – Herma Szabo, Austrian figure skater (b. 1902)
 May 9
 Herschel Bernardi, American actor (b. 1923)
 Tenzing Norgay, Nepalese sherpa (b. 1914)
 May 11
 Vladimir Pravik, Soviet firefighter (b. 1962)
 Aleksandr Akimov, Soviet engineer who was the shift supervisor during the events of the Chernobyl disaster (b. 1953)
 May 12
 Elisabeth Bergner, Austrian actress (b. 1897)
 Alicia Moreau de Justo, Argentine physician, politician, pacifist and human rights activist (b. 1885)
 May 13 – Vasily Ignatenko, Soviet firefighter who responded to the Chernobyl disaster (b. 1961)
 May 15
 Elio de Angelis, Italian race car driver (b. 1958)
 Theodore White, American writer (b. 1915)
 May 20 – Helen B. Taussig, American cardiologist (b. 1898)
 May 23
 Sterling Hayden, American actor (b. 1916)
 Altiero Spinelli, Italian political theorist and European federalist (b. 1907)
 May 24 – Yakima Canutt, American actor and stuntman (b. 1895)
 May 25 – Chester Bowles, American politician (b. 1901)
 May 26 – Gian-Carlo Coppola, American film producer (b. 1963)
 May 28 – Lurene Tuttle, American actress (b. 1907)
 May 30 – Perry Ellis, American fashion designer (b. 1940)
 May 31 – James Rainwater, American physicist, Nobel Prize laureate (b. 1917)

June

 June 3 – Dame Anna Neagle, English actress (b. 1904)
 June 5 – Bryan Grant, American tennis champion (b. 1909)
 June 11 – Chesley Bonestell, American painter (b. 1888)
 June 13 – Benny Goodman, American jazz musician (b. 1909)
 June 14
 Alan Jay Lerner, American lyricist (b. 1918)
 Jorge Luis Borges, Argentine writer (b. 1899)
 June 16 – Maurice Duruflé, French composer (b. 1902)
 June 17 – Kate Smith, American singer (b. 1907)
 June 19
 Len Bias, American basketball player (b. 1963)
 Coluche, stage name of Michel Colucci, French comedian and humorist (b. 1944)
 June 23 – Sir Moses Finley, British classicist (b. 1912)
 June 26 – Kunio Maekawa, Japanese architect (b. 1905)
 June 27 – Don Rogers, American football player (b. 1962)
 June 28 – Mary Anderson, American actress (b. 1897)

July

 July 3 – Rudy Vallée, American singer, actor, and bandleader (b. 1901)
 July 4 – Oscar Zariski, Russian mathematician (b. 1899)
 July 6 – Jagjivan Ram, Indian politician (b. 1908)
 July 8 – Hyman G. Rickover, American admiral (b. 1900)
 July 14 – Raymond Loewy, French-born industrial designer (b. 1893)
 July 18
 Buddy Baer, American boxer and actor (b. 1915)
 Stanley Rous, English administrator, 6th President of FIFA (b. 1895)
 July 19 – Alfredo Binda, Italian cyclist (b. 1902)
 July 22 – Floyd Gottfredson, American cartoonist (b. 1905)
 July 24
 Fritz Albert Lipmann, American biochemist, recipient of the Nobel Prize in Physiology or Medicine (b. 1899)
 Yoshiyuki Tsuruta, Japanese Olympic swimmer (b. 1903)
 July 25
 Ted Lyons, American baseball player (Chicago White Sox) and member of the MLB Hall of Fame (b. 1900)
 Vincente Minnelli, American film director (b. 1903)
 July 26 – W. Averell Harriman, American diplomat and politician (b. 1891)
 July 31
 Patriarch Iustin of Romania (b. 1910)
 Teddy Wilson, American jazz pianist (b. 1912)
 Chiune Sugihara, Japanese diplomat and humanitarian who saved Jewish WWII refugees (b. 1900)

August

 August 2 – Roy Cohn, American lawyer (b. 1927)
 August 6 – Emilio Fernández, Mexican film director, actor and screenwriter (b. 1904)
 August 11 – Chuck McKinley, American tennis champion (b. 1941)
 August 18 – Harun Babunagari, Bangladeshi Islamic scholar and educationist (b. 1902)
 August 19 – Hermione Baddeley, British actress (b. 1906)
 August 20 – Thad Jones, American jazz musician (b. 1923)
 August 22 – Celâl Bayar, Turkish politician, 3rd Prime Minister of Turkey and President of Turkey (b. 1883)
 August 23 – Mikhail Kuznetsov, Soviet actor (b. 1918)
 August 24 – Harry Benjamin, American endocrinologist and sexologist (b. 1885)
 August 26 – Ted Knight, American actor (b. 1923)
 August 27 – George Nēpia, New Zealand Maori rugby player (b. 1905)
 August 31
 Henry Moore, British sculptor (b. 1898)
 Urho Kekkonen, Finnish politician, 21st Prime Minister of Finland and 8th President of Finland (b. 1900)
 Jorge Alessandri, Chilean engineer, entrepreneur and politician, 27th President of Chile (b. 1896)

September

 September 1 – Murray Hamilton, American actor (b. 1923)
 September 3 – Vittorino Veronese, Italian lawyer and international servant, 4th Director-General of UNESCO (b. 1910)
 September 4 – Hank Greenberg, American baseball player and member of the MLB Hall of Fame (b. 1911)
 September 6 – Blanche Sweet, American actress (b. 1896)
 September 7 – Omar Ali Saifuddien III, Sultan of Brunei (b. 1914)
 September 11
 Jacques Henri Lartigue, French painter (b. 1894)
 Panagiotis Kanellopoulos, Greek author and politician, 164th Prime Minister of Greece (b. 1902)
 Henry DeWolf Smyth, American physicist (b. 1898)
 September 18 – Pat Phoenix, English actress (b. 1923)
 September 22 – József Asbóth, Hungarian tennis champion (b. 1917)
 September 23 – Gottfried Freiherr von Banfield, Austro-Hungarian naval aeroplane pilot in the First World War (b. 1890)
 September 25 – Nikolay Semyonov, Russian chemist, Nobel Prize laureate (b. 1896)
 September 26 – Noboru Terada, Japanese Olympic swimmer (b. 1917)
 September 27 – Cliff Burton, American musician and songwriter (b. 1962)
 September 28 – Robert Helpmann, Australian actor, dancer and choreographer (b. 1909)
 September 29 – Prince George Valdemar of Denmark (b. 1920)

October

 October 4 – Arno von Lenski, German military officer and general (b. 1893)
 October 5
 Hal B. Wallis, American film producer (b. 1898)
 James H. Wilkinson, British mathematician (b. 1919)
 October 10 – Michele Pellegrino, Italian Roman Catholic cardinal (b. 1903)
 October 11 – Georges Dumézil, French philologist and historian (b. 1898)
 October 14 – Keenan Wynn, American actor (b. 1916)
 October 16 – Arthur Grumiaux, Belgian violinist (b. 1921)
 October 19 – Samora Machel, Mozambican military commander, politician and revolutionary, 1st President of Mozambique (b. 1933)
 October 21 – Fritz Hochwälder, Austrian author (b. 1911)
 October 22 – Albert Szent-Györgyi, Hungarian physiologist, Nobel Prize laureate (b. 1893)
 October 23 – Edward Adelbert Doisy, American biochemist, recipient of the Nobel Prize in Physiology or Medicine (b. 1893)
 October 25 – Forrest Tucker, American actor (b. 1919)
 October 26 – Jackson Scholz, American Olympic athlete (b. 1897)
 October 31 – Robert S. Mulliken, American physicist and chemist, recipient of the Nobel Prize in Chemistry (b. 1896)

November

 November 2 – Paul Frees, American actor, comedian (b. 1920)
 November 4 – Abdallah El-Yafi, Lebanese politician, 9th Prime Minister of Lebanon (b. 1901)
 November 5 – Claude Jutra, Canadian film director (b. 1930)
 November 6 – Elisabeth Grümmer, Alsatian soprano (b. 1911)
 November 7 - Tracy Pew Australian musician (b. 1957)
 November 8
 Artur London, Czech statesman (b. 1915)
 Vyacheslav Molotov, Soviet politician (b. 1890)
 November 11 – Roger C. Carmel, American actor (b. 1932)
 November 15 – Alexandre Tansman, French composer and virtuoso pianist (b. 1897)
 November 16 – Siobhán McKenna, Irish actress (b. 1923)
 November 18 – Gia Carangi, American supermodel (b. 1960)
 November 21
 Jerry Colonna, American comedian (b. 1904)
 Dar Robinson, American stunt performer and actor (b. 1947)
 November 22
 Scatman Crothers, American actor, musician (b. 1910)
 Dinny Pails, Australian tennis player (b. 1921)
 November 29 – Cary Grant, English actor (b. 1904)

December

 December 2 – Desi Arnaz, Cuban-born American actor, bandleader, musician and television producer (b. 1917)
 December 8 – Anatoly Marchenko, Soviet dissident and author (b. 1938)
 December 10 – Susan Cabot, American actress (b. 1927)
 December 12 – Paul Verner, German politician (b. 1911)
 December 13
 Heather Angel, British-born American actress (b. 1909)
 Ella Baker, American civil rights activist (b. 1903)
 December 14 – Antal Páger, Hungarian actor (b. 1899)
 December 15 – Serge Lifar, Soviet dancer and choreographer (b. 1905)
 December 17
 Guillermo Cano Isaza, Colombian journalist (b. 1925)
 Wanis al-Qaddafi, Libyan politician, 10th Prime Minister of Libya (b. 1924)
 December 21 – Willy Coppens, Belgian pilot (b. 1892)
 December 24
 Gardner Fox, American writer (b. 1911)
 Richard van der Riet Woolley, English astronomer (b. 1906)
 December 26 – Elsa Lanchester, British-American actress (b. 1902)
 December 29
 Harold Macmillan, Prime Minister of the United Kingdom (b. 1894)
 Pietro Parente, Italian Roman Catholic cardinal (b. 1891)
 Andrei Tarkovsky, Russian filmmaker, writer, and film theorist (b. 1932)
 December 31 – Lloyd Haynes, American actor (b. 1934)

Date unknown
 D.R. Kaprekar, Indian recreational mathematician (b. 1905)

Nobel Prizes

 Physics – Ernst Ruska, Gerd Binnig, Heinrich Rohrer
 Chemistry – Dudley R. Herschbach, Yuan T. Lee, John Polanyi
 Physiology or Medicine – Stanley Cohen, Rita Levi-Montalcini
 Literature – Wole Soyinka
 Peace – Elie Wiesel
 Economics – James M. Buchanan

References